Bangi was a state constituency in Selangor, Malaysia, that had been represented in the Selangor State Legislative Assembly since 2004 until 2018.

The state constituency was created in the 2003 redistribution and is mandated to return a single member to the Selangor State Legislative Assembly under the first past the post voting system.

History 
It was abolished in 2004 when it was redistributed.

Representation history

Election results

References

Defunct Selangor state constituencies